The National Capital Region Football Association, also known as the NCR Football Association or NCRFA, is a Filipino football association based in Metro Manila. It works under the Philippine Football Federation as regional football association for Metro Manila.

References

1982 establishments in the Philippines
Football governing bodies in the Philippines
Sports organizations established in 1982
Sports in Metro Manila